Brennan Clost (born October 20, 1994) is a Canadian actor and dancer, known for starring in the Family series The Next Step, and the Netflix dance drama series Tiny Pretty Things.

Early and personal life
Clost was born on October 20, 1994, in Burlington, Ontario. Whilst growing up, he was bullied by classmates, stating that they made "very crass comments", threw snowballs at him and he would "get looks" in the hallway. Clost studied dance at various dance studios across southern Ontario, including National Ballet School of Canada and Springboard Danse Montreal. Initially wanting to study medicine at university, he was advised by his dance teacher to audition for the Juilliard School.

In March 2012, he auditioned and was accepted into the Juilliard School on a scholarship, making it as one of two male Canadian dancers to be accepted onto the course. Clost's choreography was showcased annually at Juilliard's Choreographic Honours Program and in elementary schools throughout New York City, and he graduated in 2016. Through dance, Clost has damaged his ankle, had Achilles tendinitis and had "serious wrist and shoulder problems". Clost has stated that he does not label himself with a sexuality, but added that he is "not straight".

Career
Clost began dancing competitively at the age of seven. His accolades include being world silver medalist in the International Dance Organization junior soloist category in Germany (2008), and being named as one of the Top Senior Male Dancers at The Dance Awards in New York City (2011). In 2012, he made his professional acting debut in a television advertisement for shaving company Gillette. In the same year, he was cast in the Family series The Next Step as Daniel. He portrayed the role regularly until 2015, when he took a two-year break to focus on completing his studies at Juilliard, returning in 2017. Also in 2017, Clost starred in the in web series Spiral, alongside The Next Step co-star Alexandra Beaton. In 2019, he was cast in the Netflix dance drama series Tiny Pretty Things as Shane, which premiered in December 2020, but was not renewed for a second season, as stated by Clost on his YouTube channel.

Filmography

References

External links
 

1994 births
Canadian male dancers
Canadian male child actors
Canadian male film actors
Canadian male television actors
Juilliard School alumni
Living people
LGBT dancers
Canadian LGBT actors
Male actors from Ontario
People from Burlington, Ontario
21st-century Canadian male actors
21st-century Canadian dancers
21st-century Canadian LGBT people